Dzmitry Baradzin (born 19 July 1999) is a Belarusian professional footballer who plays for Kaisar.

Honours
Gomel
Belarusian Cup winner: 2021–22

Ordabasy
Kazakhstan Cup winner: 2022

References

External links 
 
 Profile at FC Gomel website
 

1999 births
Sportspeople from Gomel
Living people
Belarusian footballers
Belarusian expatriate footballers
Expatriate footballers in Russia
Expatriate footballers in Kazakhstan
Association football midfielders
Russian First League players
FC Gomel players
FC Orsha players
FC Smolevichi players
FC Dinamo Minsk players
FC Isloch Minsk Raion players
FC Chayka Peschanokopskoye players
FC Ordabasy players
FC Kaisar players